The 1949–50 DDR-Oberliga, playing as the DS-Liga in its first season as the DDR, the German Democratic Republic was only formed after the start of the season, was the inaugural season of the DDR-Oberliga, the first tier of league football in East Germany. 

The league was contested by 14 teams and ZSG Horch Zwickau won the championship. It was the second and last East German championship for Zwickau, having previously won the 1948 edition under the name of SG Planitz.

Heinz Satrapa of ZSG Horch Zwickau was the league's top scorer with 23 goals.

Table									
The 1949–50 season was the inaugural season of the league.

Results

Name changes
East German clubs were subject to frequent name changes in this era. The following 1949–50 DDR-Oberliga clubs changed their name during the off-season and in the season.

References

Sources

External links
 Das Deutsche Fussball Archiv  Historic German league tables

1949–50 in European association football leagues
1949-50
1949–50 in German football leagues
1949–50 in East German football